55th Street may refer to:

In New York City
55th Street (Manhattan)
55th Street (BMT West End Line)

Elsewhere
55th Street (Chicago)
East 55th (RTA Rapid Transit station), Cleveland, Ohio